Hana Hegedušić (born 29 January 1976) is a Croatian actress. She appeared in more than twenty films since 1997.

Selected filmography

Voice-over roles

References

External links 

1976 births
Living people
Actresses from Zagreb
Croatian film actresses